Mariana Tîrcă (born 9 October 1962) is a retired Romanian handball player. She is considered a living legend of the Romanian and international handball, being voted top 5 women handball players of the 20th century.

She has played 335 games for the Romanian national team, and scored 2043 goals. Tîrcă played until the age of 41, and is currently the player with most goals for any handball national team in the world.

International honours
Player
 Women's EHF Champions League: Winner 1996 (with Podravka Koprivnica)
 EHF Women's Champions Trophy: Winner 1996 (with Podravka Koprivnica)

Coach
 Romanian Women's Handball League: Winner 2006 (with Rulmentul Braşov)
 Women's EHF Challenge Cup: Winner 2007 (with Rulmentul Braşov)
 Women's EHF Cup Winners' Cup: Runner-up 2008 (with Rulmentul Braşov)

Personal life
Mariana Tîrcă is an honorary citizen of Croatia.

She is married with Sorin Tîrcă and has one daughter, Sorina.

References

1962 births
Living people
People from Brașov County
Romanian female handball players
Romanian expatriate sportspeople in Croatia
RK Podravka Koprivnica players